Hydnocerinae is a subfamily of beetles in the family Cleridae. There are at least 70 described species in Hydnocerinae.

Genera
 Isohydnocera Chapin, 1917
 Phyllobaenus Dejean, 1837
 Wolcottia Chapin, 1917

References

Citations

General references

 Bouchard, P., Y. Bousquet, A. Davies, M. Alonso-Zarazaga, J. Lawrence, C. Lyal, A. Newton, et al. (2011). "Family-group names in Coleoptera (Insecta)". ZooKeys, vol. 88, 1–972.
 Lawrence, J. F., and A. F. Newton Jr. / Pakaluk, James, and Stanislaw Adam Slipinski, eds. (1995). "Families and subfamilies of Coleoptera (with selected genera, notes, references and data on family-group names)". Biology, Phylogeny, and Classification of Coleoptera: Papers Celebrating the 80th Birthday of Roy A. Crowson, vol. 2, 779–1006.
 Opitz, Weston / Arnett, Ross H. Jr., Michael C. Thomas, Paul E. Skelley, and J. Howard Frank, eds. (2002). "Family 73. Cleridae Latreille 1804". American Beetles, vol. 2: Polyphaga: Scarabaeoidea through Curculionoidea, 267–280.

Further reading

 Arnett, R. H. Jr., M. C. Thomas, P. E. Skelley and J. H. Frank. (eds.) (21 June 2002). American Beetles, Volume II: Polyphaga: Scarabaeoidea through Curculionoidea. CRC Press LLC, Boca Raton, Florida .
 Arnett, Ross H. Jr. (2017). American Insects: A Handbook of the Insects of America North of Mexico (2nd ed.). CRC Press. . .
 White, Richard E. (1983). Peterson Field Guides: Beetles. Houghton Mifflin Company.

External links
 

Cleridae
Beetle subfamilies